Dorothy Hazzard formerly Dorothy Kelly ( – March 14 (latest date), 1674) was an English Baptist leader in Bristol. She was a leading defender of the city when it came under attack by the Royalists.

Life 
Hazzard's original name and her place and date of birth are unknown. She comes to notice when she and her husband Anthony started a religious group in Bristol. They had a grocer's shop in the High Street. She was preaching and was called a "he-goat" for doing so. They were derided not only for having women as preachers but also for the women in their congregation. On one occasion their house was damaged by a crowd who objected to 
a "Conventicle of Puritans".

By 1640 her first husband was dead but she kept the shop open. In that year she married Matthew Hazzard who was the recently appointed vicar of St Ewin's, Bristol. Dorothy would allow pregnant women to reside at the parsonage when they should have been at church and they also gave homes to families en route to America.

She gave evidence when Colonel Nathaniel Fiennes was charged with cowardice for surrendering Bristol to the Royalists. She gave evidence that she had placed her goods here and Fiennes had surrendered. She and 200 women were said have been ready to stop bullets to defend the Frome gate using woolsacks. Fiennes was found guilty at St Albans by the council of war in December of having surrendered Bristol improperly, and sentenced to death. He was, however, pardoned.

Hazzard died in Bristol at the latest date of 14 March 1674 when her recent death was recorded.

References

Source
 

1674 deaths
Religious leaders
People from Bristol
Roundheads